La somnambule is a ballet-pantomime composed by Ferdinand Hérold and premiered  on 19 September 1827 at the Académie Royale de Musique.  The scenario was by Eugène Scribe, and it was choreographed by Jean-Pierre Aumer. This ballet was produced in 1827 at the height of a fashion for stage works incorporating somnambulism.  The work was quite popular in Paris and inspired many more works incorporating somnambulism, including Vincenzo Bellini's well-known Italian opera La sonnambula.

Although the work was unperformed for over 150 years and remains unpublished, it was rediscovered and recorded under the direction of conductor Richard Bonynge, and released in 2005.

External links
Melba Recordings page on the work, accessed 8 July 2011

Ballets by Ferdinand Hérold
Ballets by Jean-Pierre Aumer
1827 in music
1827 ballet premieres
Adaptations of works by Eugène Scribe